This is a list of National Collegiate Athletic Association (NCAA) men's lacrosse head coaches by number of career wins. Head coaches with a combined career record of at least 250 wins at the Division I, Division II, Division III, or historically equivalent level are included here.

Coaches
 * = Active coaches.
 Statistics current through the 2020 season.

See also
 NCAA Division I men's lacrosse records

References

 
Lacrosse, Men
Colleg